Clive Spong is an English illustrator of The Railway Series books by the Rev. W. Awdry. He illustrated the books written by Christopher Awdry published since 1983.

Books

Really Useful Engines
James and the Diesel Engines
Great Little Engines
More About Thomas the Tank Engine
Gordon the High-Speed Engine
Toby, Trucks and Trouble
Thomas and the Twins
Jock the New Engine
Thomas and the Great Railway Show
Thomas Comes Home
Henry and the Express
Wilbert the Forest Engine
Thomas and the Fat Controller's Engines
New Little Engine
Thomas and Victoria
Thomas and His Friends

History

Spong is a graduate of Leicester College of Art, like John T. Kenney and Clarence Reginald Dalby, who were among the earlier illustrators of the Railway Series books. He remained the illustrator throughout the run of Christopher Awdry's 14 books, illustrating more titles in the series than any other artist. 
 
Spong was one of the first illustrators to break Wilbert's golden rule about engines having no faces outside of Sodor – he did this in book 32 of the series, Toby, Trucks and Trouble – depicting Toby and his brother with faces whilst outside Sodor; in book 35, Thomas and the Great Railway Show – depicting National Collection engines such as Mallard, Duchess of Hamilton, Green Arrow and Iron Duke (complete with a mustache) with faces; and in book 38, Wilbert the Forest Engine – depicting Sixteen with a face when on his railway outside of Sodor. He also illustrated pop-up books including Henry and the Elephant from Troublesome Engines.

Railway Series spinoffs

Spong illustrated pop-up books and the spin-offs, Thomas's Christmas Party, Thomas and the Evil Diesel, Thomas and the Missing Christmas Tree, and also The Rev. W. Awdry's extended rewrite of Thomas Comes to Breakfast. Some of his character illustrations were used to depict characters in The Island of Sodor: Its People, History and Railways

My Thomas Story Library
Clive Spong did the illustrations for the My Thomas Story Library book BoCo, along with Jerry Smith. This is the only non-Railway Series book he worked on.

References 

The Railway Series illustrators
Year of birth missing (living people)
Living people